The Belgium men's national ice hockey team is the national men's ice hockey team of Belgium, and has been a member of the International Ice Hockey Federation (IIHF) since 1908. They have played in four Olympic Games, the last in 1936. The team also participated in the European Championships from 1910 to 1932. They have won 2 bronze medals (1910, 1911), 1 silver medal (1927), and 1 gold medal (1913).

Tournament participation

Olympic Games

World Championships
1930 – Finished in 10th place
1933 – Finished in 12th place
1934 – Finished in 11th place
1935 – Finished in 14th place
1939 – Finished in 12th place
1947 – Finished in 8th place
1949 – Finished in 9th place
1950 – Finished in 7th place
1951 – Finished in 4th place Criterium Européen
1952 – Finished 5th place in Pool B
1955 – Finished in 6th place in Pool B
1956 – Finished in 3rd place in Pool B
1961 – Finished in 6th place in Pool C
1963 – Finished in 6th place in Pool C
1970 – Finished in 7th place in Pool C
1971 – Finished in 8th place in Pool C
1975 – Finished in 7th place in Pool C
1977 – Finished in 6th place in Pool C
1978 – Finished in 8th place in Pool C
1987 – Finished in 8th place in Pool C
1989 – Finished in 1st place in Pool D
1990 – Finished in 8th place in Pool C
1991 – Finished in 9th place in Pool C
1992 – Finished in 5th place in Pool C1
1993 – Finished in 8th place in Pool C
1994 – Finished in 5th place in Pool C2
1995 – Finished in 5th place in Pool C2
1996 – Finished in 4th place in Pool D
1997 – Finished in 8th place in Pool D
1998 – Finished in 4th place in Pool D
1999 – Finished in 4th place in Pool D
2000 – Finished in 2nd place in Pool D
2001 – Finished in 5th place in Division II, Group B
2002 – Finished in 2nd place in Division II, Group A
2003 – Finished in 1st place in Division II, Group B
2004 – Finished in 6th place in Division I, Group A
2005 – Finished in 4th place in Division II, Group B
2006 – Finished in 3rd place in Division II, Group A
2007 – Finished in 2nd place in Division II, Group A
2008 – Finished in 2nd place in Division II, Group A
2009 – Finished in 2nd place in Division II, Group B
2010 – Finished in 3rd place in Division II, Group A
2011 – Finished in 4th place in Division II, Group A
2012 – Finished in 1st place in Division II, Group B
2013 – Finished in 2nd place in Division II, Group A
2014 – Finished in 5th place in Division II, Group A
2015 – Finished in 2nd place in Division II, Group A
2016 – Finished in 3rd place in Division II, Group A
2017 – Finished in 4th place in Division II, Group A
2018 – Finished in 5th place in Division II, Group A
2019 – Finished in 6th place in Division II, Group A
2020 – Cancelled due to the COVID-19 pandemic
2021 – Cancelled due to the COVID-19 pandemic
2022 – Finished in 3rd place in Division II, Group B

European Championships

Hockey Hall of Fame members
 Paul Loicq, team captain, player-coach, president of the International Ice Hockey Federation

References

External links

IIHF profile
National Teams of Ice Hockey

Ice hockey in Belgium
National ice hockey teams in Europe
I